Hawk Run is a census-designated place located in Morris Township, Clearfield County, in the state of Pennsylvania. As of the 2020 census the population was 474.

Demographics

References

Census-designated places in Clearfield County, Pennsylvania
Census-designated places in Pennsylvania